Kamenný Most is a village and municipality in the Nové Zámky District in the Nitra Region of south-west Slovakia.

Geography
The village lies at an altitude of 114 metres and covers an area of 20.336 km².

History
In historical records the village was first mentioned in 1271
After the Austro-Hungarian army disintegrated in November 1918, Czechoslovak troops occupied the area, later acknowledged internationally by the Treaty of Trianon. Between 1938 and 1945 Kamenný Most once more  became part of Miklós Horthy's Hungary through the First Vienna Award. From 1945 until the Velvet Divorce, it was part of Czechoslovakia. Since then it has been part of Slovakia.

Population
On 31 December 2011, it had a population of 1054 people.

Facilities
The village has a public library and a football pitch.

See also
 List of municipalities and towns in Slovakia

References

Genealogical resources

The records for genealogical research are available at the state archive "Statny Archiv in Nitra, Slovakia"

 Roman Catholic church records (births/marriages/deaths): 1720-1895 (parish A)

External links
https://web.archive.org/web/20070513023228/http://www.statistics.sk/mosmis/eng/run.html
Kamenný Most – Nové Zámky Okolie
Surnames of living people in Kamenny Most

Villages and municipalities in Nové Zámky District